Anhelina Kalinina was the defending champion but she chose to compete at the 2022 GB Pro-Series Shrewsbury instead.

Kamilla Rakhimova won the title, defeating Wang Xinyu in the final, 6–4, 6–4.

Seeds

Draw

Finals

Top half

Bottom half

References

External Links
Main Draw

Engie Open Nantes Atlantique - Singles